Enteremna is a moth genus of the family Depressariidae.

Species
 Enteremna dolerastis (Meyrick, 1890)
 Enteremna pallida (Turner, 1939)

References

Depressariinae
Moth genera
Taxa named by Edward Meyrick